The 1988–89 Cypriot Cup was the 47th edition of the Cypriot Cup. A total of 68 clubs entered the competition. It began on 16 November 1988 with the first preliminary round and concluded on 10 June 1989 with the final which was held at Tsirion Stadium. AEL Limassol won their 6th Cypriot Cup trophy after beating Aris 3–2 in the final.

Format 
In the 1988–89 Cypriot Cup, participated all the teams of the Cypriot First Division, the Cypriot Second Division, the Cypriot Third Division and 24 of the 42 teams of the Cypriot Fourth Division.

The competition consisted of seven knock-out rounds. In the preliminary rounds each tie was played as a single leg and was held at the home ground of the one of the two teams, according to the draw results. Each tie winner was qualifying to the next round. If a match was drawn, extra time was following. If extra time was drawn, there was a replay at the ground of the team who were away for the first game. If the rematch was also drawn, then extra time was following and if the match remained drawn after extra time the winner was decided by penalty shoot-out.

The next four rounds were played in a two-legged format, each team playing a home and an away match against their opponent. The team which scored more goals on aggregate, was qualifying to the next round. If the two teams scored the same number of goals on aggregate, then the team which scored more goals away from home was advancing to the next round.
 
If both teams had scored the same number of home and away goals, then extra time was following after the end of the second leg match. If during the extra thirty minutes both teams had managed to score, but they had scored the same number of goals, then the team who scored the away goals was advancing to the next round (i.e. the team which was playing away). If there weren't scored any goals during extra time, the qualifying team was determined by penalty shoot-out.

The cup winner secured a place in the 1989–90 European Cup Winners' Cup.

First preliminary round 
All the 14 clubs of the Cypriot Third Division and 24 clubs from the Cypriot Fourth Division (6 first of league table of each group the day of draw) participated in the first preliminary round.

Second preliminary round 
The 15 clubs of the Cypriot Second Division advanced directly to the second preliminary round and met the winners of the first preliminary round ties:

First round 
The 15 clubs of the Cypriot First Division advanced directly to the first round and met the winners of the second preliminary round ties:

Second round

Quarter-finals

Semi-finals

Final

Sources

See also 
 Cypriot Cup
 1988–89 Cypriot First Division

Cypriot Cup seasons
1988–89 domestic association football cups
1988–89 in Cypriot football